Víctor Estrella and Santiago González were the defending champions, but González chose to play in Zagreb instead. Estrella partnered another Mexican player Bruno Rodríguez, but they lost to Treat Conrad Huey and Harsh Mankad in the quarterfinals.

Brian Battistone and Ryler DeHeart won in the final 5–7, 7–6(4), [10–8] against Gero Kretschmer and Alex Satschko.

Seeds

Draw

Draw

References
 Doubles Draw
 Qualifying Draw

Sarasota Open - Doubles
2010 Doubles